F. M. Abbott was a native of Pennsylvania who founded Abbott, Mississippi. The Clarion-Ledger identified Abbott and Finis H. Little as Radical Republican state senator elects in 1869.

He settled in Mississippi after the American Civil War. He served in appointed county supervisor. His state senate seat was declared vacant because of prohibitions against holding two state offices.

He was an officer in a railroad company.

References

Republican Party Mississippi state senators
Year of birth missing
Year of death missing
American city founders
19th-century American politicians
County supervisors in Mississippi
19th-century American railroad executives